Kerala Sangeetha Nataka Akademi Award is an award given by the Kerala Sangeetha Nataka Akademi, an autonomous organisation for the encouragement, preservation, and documentation of the performing arts of Kerala, set up by the Department of Cultural Affairs of the Government of Kerala. Instituted in 1962, the awards are given in the categories of music, dance, theatre, other traditional arts, and for contribution/scholarship in performing arts. The award consists of Rs. 30,000, a citation and a plaque. The recipients of the award are also conferred the title Kalasree.

List of recipients
The recipients of the Kerala Sangeetha Nataka Akademi Award in various categories of performing arts have been listed below:

Classical Music

1962 – M. A. Kalyanakrishna Bhagavathar
1962 – K. S. Narayanaswamy (Veena)
1964 – Ambalapuzha Sankaranarayana Panicker
1964 – Ambalapuzha Gopalakrishna Panicker
1966 – M. D. Ramanathan
1969 – Kottaram Sankunny Nair (Harmonium)
1971 – Palghat K. V. Narayanaswamy
1971 – Mavelikkara Krishnankutty Nair (Mridangam)
1972 – C. S. Krishna Iyer
1972 – Parur Sundaram Iyer (Violin)
1972 – Thiruvizha Raghavan Pillai (Nadaswaram)
1973 – Vaikom Vasudevan Nair
1973 – Chunangad Appu Iyer (Mridangam)
1974 – Puthucode Krishnamoorthy
1975 – Kaviyoor C. K. Revamma
1976 – Cherthala Gopalan Nair
1976 – Chittoor Sankara Panicker (Nadaswaram)
1977 – Parassala B. Ponnammal
1978 – L. P. R. Varma
1979 – K. R. Kedaranathan
1981 – Neyyattinkara Vasudevan
1981 – Mavelikkara Velukkutty Nair (Mridangam)
1982 – Trivandrum R. Venkataraman (Veena)
1982 – Kamala Kailasanathan
1982 – Mavelikkara Sankarankutty Nair (Mridangam)
1983 – P. Leela
1983 – M. K. Kalyana Krishna Bhagavathar (Veena)
1983 – T. V. Gopalakrishnan (Mridangam)
1983 – P. K. Sankaran (Nadaswaram)
1985 – Mavelikkara Prabhakara Varma
1985 – Mavelikkara S. R. Raju (Mridangam)
1986 – Vechoor Harihara Subramania Iyer
1987 – Trichur V. Ramachandran
1988 – V. V. Subrahmanyam (Violin)
1989 – Mangad K. Natesan
1990 – Renuka Girijan
1991 – K. G. Jayan
1992 – Palkulangara Ambika Devi
1992 – Tripunithura G. Narayana Swamy (Mridangam)
1993 – P. R. Kumara Kerala Varma
1993 – Rajeswari Menon (Veena)
1994 – A. K. Raveendranath
1994 – S. Hariharan Nair
1995 – Trivandrum R. Krishnaswamy
1995 – Puthukode S. Krishna (Mridangam)
1996 – Pala C. K. Ramachandran
1996 – Aranmula Govindankutty (Thakil)
1996 – Malabar Sukumaran Bhagavathar
1997 – K. Omanakutty (Vocal)
1997 – Tripunithura N. Radhakrishnan (Ghatam)
1997 – Pappukutty Bhagavathar
1998 – Neyyattinkara Mohanachandran (Vocal)
1998 – T. S. Babu (Violin)
1998 – Trivandrum V. Surendran (Mridangam)
1999 – K. S. Gopalakrishnan (Pullamkuzhal)
1999 – Tripunithura Lalitha (Vocal)
2000 – Sukumari Narendra Menon (Vocal)
2000 – Parassala Ravi (Mridangam)
2000 – Nedumangad Sivanandan (Violin)
2000 – Ambilikuttan (Vocal)
2001 – Gopalan Nair (Ganjira)
2001 – Vettikavala K. N. Sasikumar (Nadaswaram)
2002 – Ananthalakshmi Venkitaraman (Vocal)
2002 – Aryanad G. Sadasivan (Vocal)
2002 – V. Balakrishnan Potty (Veena)
2003 – N. P. Ramaswami (Vocal)
2003 – Mathangi Sathyamoorthy (Vocal)
2003 – T. V. Ramani (Violin)
2004 – Leelamani Radhakrishnan (Vocal)
2004 – Thiruvizha Sivanandan (Violin)
2004 – S. Sai Babu (Violin)
2004 – K. R. Anto (Flute)
2004 – Cherthala N. Sreekumar Varma (Mridangam)
2005 – Malini Hariharan (Vocal)
2005 – A. Ananthapadmanabhan (Veena)
2005 – Guruvayur Dwari (Mridangam)
2005 – Trichur P. Govindankutty (Nadaswaram)
2006 – G. Seethalakshmi Ammal (Vocal)
2006 – Pazhayannur K. G. Krishnankutty (Nadaswaram)
2006 – Trichur C. Rajendran (Violin)
2006 – Alappuzha Chandrasekharan Nair (Thalavadyam)
2007 – Chalakudy N. S. Balakrishnan
2007 – Varkala C. S. Jayaram
2007 – Thuravoor R. Narayana Panicker (Nadaswaram)
2007 – N. Hari (Mridangam)
2008 – Mukhathala Sivaji
2008 – T. M. Abdul Azeez (Violin)
2008 – Neyyattinkara Krishnan (Mukharsangh)
2008 – Kalyani Menon
2009 – Ayamkudi Mani
2009 – T. H. Subramaniam  (Violin)
2009 – R. Karuna Moorthy (Thakil)
2009 – Palakkad K. Jayakrishnan (Mridangam)
2010 – Shertallay K. N. Renganatha Sharma (Vocal)
2010 – K. V. Prasad (Mridangam)
2010 – T. H. Lalitha (Violin)
2011 – Kavalam Sreekumar
2011 – Ramesh Narayan
2011 – Orumanayoor O. K. Gopi (Nadaswaram)
2012 – Trivandrum Krishnakumar
2012 – Binni Krishnakumar
2012 – Vanaja Sankar
2013 – Sreevalsan J. Menon
2013 – M. K. Sankaran Namboothiri
2013 – Kuzhalmannam G. Ramakrishnan (Mridangam)
2013 – Adichanallur Anilkumar (Ghatam)
2014 – P. Unnikrishnan (Carnatic Music)
2014 – Paul Poovathingal (Carnatic Music)
2014 – Attukal Balasubramaniam (Violin)
2014 – G. Babu (Mridangam)
2015 – Mavelikkara P. Subramaniam
2015 – S. R. Mahadeva Sarma (Violin)
2015 – S. R. Rajasree (Violin)
2015 – Nanjil A. R. Arul  (Mridangam)
2016 – V. V. Ravi (Violin)
2016 – Trivandrum R. Vaidhyanathan (Mridangam)
2016 – Adoor P. Sudarsanan (Carnatic Music)
2017 – M. Narmadha (Violin)
2017 – Cherthala R Jayadevan (Mridangam)
2017 – Thamarakkad Govindan Namboothiri (Carnatic Music)
2018 – Arakkal Nandakumar (Music)
2018 – Retnasree Iyer (Tabla)
2019 – Nemmara N. R. Kannan (Nadaswaram)
2019 – Anayadi Prasad (Music)
2020 – K. Venkitaraman (Vocal)
2020 – Babu Narayanan (Violin)
2020 – Premkumar Vadakara (Music Direction)
2021 – Kollam V. Sajikumar (Vocal)
2021 – N. P. Prabhakaran (Music)

Drama

 1962 – Mavelikkara Ponnamma
 1966 – Sebastian Kunjukunju Bhagavathar
 1969 – Artist P. J. Cherian
 1969 – N. N. Pillai
 1971 – Kodungallur Ammini Amma
 1972 – Swami Brahmavruthan
 1973 – N. Krishna Pillai
 1973 – Oachira P. K. Sankarankutty Nair
 1974 – Pariyanampatta Divakaran
 1974 – C. K. Rajam
 1975 – T. R. Sukumaran Nair
 1975 – K. P. A. C. Sulochana
 1976 – K. V. Neelakantan Nair (Green Room)
 1976 – Vijayakumari
 1977 – Kunjandi
 1977 – Omana
 1978 – Kalaikkal Kumaran
 1978 – Kozhikode Santha Devi
 1978 – Artist Kesavan (Rangasilpam)
 1979 – Thoppil Krishna Pillai
 1979 – Chachappan
 1980 – Vasu Pradeep
 1980 – Mavelikkara Kamalamma
 1981 – K. M. Raghavan Nambiar
 1981 – M. S. Namboothiri
 1981 – Sudharma
 1982 – Vaikom Mani
 1982 – N. S. Ittan
 1982 – O. Madhavan
 1982 – T. P. Gopalan
 1982 – Adoor Bhavani
 1983 – Jagathy N. K. Achary
 1983 – Nellimoodu K. Ramakrishna Pillai (Green Room)
 1985 – V. T. Vikraman Nair
 1986 – K. G. Sethunath
 1987 – D. K. Chellappan
 1989 – Changanassery Natarajan
 1990 – Vakkom Shakeer
 1991 – Pappukutty Bhagavathar
 1991 – William D'Cruz
 1991 – S. L. Puram Sadanandan
 1991 – P. N. Nanappan
 1992 – Sreemoolanagaram Mohan
 1993 – P. R. Chandran
 1993 – T. M. Abraham
 1994 – Kadavoor G. Chandran Pillai
 1994 – Madavoor Bhasi
 1994 – Trichur Elsi
 1995 – P. K. Venukuttan Nair
 1995 – Ibrahim Vengara
 1996 – P. K. Raghavan
 1996 – K. G. Devaki Amma
 1997 – K. Thayat
 1997 – Maya Narayanan
 1997 – Saithan Joseph
 1998 – T. V. Gopinath (Direction)
 1998 – N. G. Panicker
 1999 – K. M. Dharman (Direction)
 1999 – K. P. A. C. Rajamma (Actress)
 2000 – K. K. Jacob
 2000 – N. Somasundaram
 2001 – K. S. Namboothiri (Script)
 2002 – Nilambur Ayisha
 2002 – Vayala Vasudevan Pillai
 2002 – P. V. Kuriakose (Script)
 2003 – A. A. Chandrahasan
 2003 – V. Chandransekharan Vaidyar
 2004 – Paravur George
 2004 – K. P. A. C. Sunny
 2004 – Krishnakumari
 2005 – M. S. Warrier
 2005 – Ammini Ernest
 2005 – Nelson Fernandez (Script, Direction)
 2006 – Sreedharan Nileshwaram
 2006 – Leela Panicker
 2006 – Karivellur Murali (Script)
 2007 – Haridas Cherukunnu
 2007 – V. R. Santha
 2008 – C. L. Jose (Script)
 2008 – Karakulam Chandran (Direction)
 2008 – P. Balachandran (Script)
 2008 – Sreekala V. K.
 2009 – P. Gangadharan (Direction)
 2009 – Savithri Sreedharan (Actress)
 2009 – Sathish Sangamithra (Actor, Direction)
 2009 – G. Gopalakrishnan (Script)
 2010 – Geetha Salam
 2010 – Jayaraj Warrier (Drama, Caricature)
 2010 – K. P. Gopalan (Direction)
 2010 – A. E. Ashraf (Light)
 2011 – Meenambalam Santhosh
 2011 – Deepan Sivaraman
 2011 – K. G. Ramu (Make-up)
 2012 – Adv. Manilal (Script)
 2012 – Abhilash Pillai (Director)
 2012 – Pattanam Rasheed (Make-up)
 2013 – Ramesh Varma (Direction)
 2013 – Rajan Kizhakkanela (Script)
 2014 – Prof. Aliyar V. Kunju
 2014 – Manu Jose
 2014 – R. Sudhakaran
 2014 – Shibu S. Kottaram
 2015 – Sherly Somasundharam (Children's Drama)
 2015 – Geetha Rangaprabhath (Children's Drama)
 2015 – Francis T. Mavelikkara
 2015 – Girish Sopanam
 2015 – Sreekanth
 2015 – Jose Koshy (Lighting)
 2015 – Pradeep Thalayal (Sound arrangement)
 2016 – Kozhikode Sarada (Actress)
 2016 – A. Santha Kumar (Script, Direction)
 2016 – C. K. Sasi (Script)
 2017 – Jayaprakash Karyal
 2017 – Kannur Vasutti
 2017 – Pradeep Roy
 2017 – Sandhya Rajendran
 2018 – K. R. Ramesh
 2018 – P. J. Unnikrishnan
 2018 – Sasikumar Souparnika
 2018 – M. V. Sherly
 2019 – John Fernadaz
 2019 – Narippatta Raju
 2019 – K. P. Suveeran
 2019 – Saheerali
 2019 – Sajitha Madathil
 2020 – Rajani Meloor
 2020 – E. A. Rajendran
 2020 – Pradeep Malavika
 2020 – Sureshbabu T.
 2020 – Gopalan Adat
 2020 – C. N. Sreevalsan
 2021 – Mangalan K. P. A. C. (Actor)
 2021 – Maniyappan Aranmula
 2021 – Babu Pallassery (Script, Direction, Actor)
 2021 – A. N. Murugan (Actor)
 2021 – Rajmohan Neeleswaram (Script, Direction)
 2021 – Sudhi Nireeksha (Actress, Direction)

Kathakali

 1962 – Chenganoor Raman Pillai
 1964 – Kurichi Kunjan Panicker
 1964 – Manjeri Sankunni Nair (Madhalam)
 1969 – Champakulam Pachu Pillai
 1969 – Kalamandalam Krishnan Nair
 1969 – Kudamaloor Karunakaran Nair
 1971 – Kalamandalam Neelakantan Nambisan
 1971 – Kalamandalam Krishnankutty Poduval (Chenda)
 1972 – Guru Gopala Panicker
 1973 – Kadathanattu Kochu Govindan Asan
 1973 – Kottakkal Kuttan Marar (Chenda)
 1973 – Kalamandalam Appukutty Poduval (Madhalam)
 1974 – Kavungal Sankarankutty Panicker
 1976 – Keezhpadam Kumaran Nair
 1977 – Cherthala Kuttappa Kurup (Music)
 1978 – Pallippuram Gopalan Nair
 1979 – Kottakkal Vasu Nedungadi (Music)
 1980 – Kalamandalam Govinda Warrier (Make-up)
 1981 – Thakazhi Kuttan Pillai (Music)
 1981 – Chalakudy Narayanan Nambeesan (Madhalam)
 1982 – K. P. Ramakrishna Panicker (Make-up)
 1982 – Kalamandalam Achunni Poduval (Chenda)
 1983 – Mekkara Narayanan Nair
 1985 – Kalamandalam Ramankutty Nair
 1985 – Chandra Mannadiyar (Chenda)
 1986 – Oyoor Kochu Govinda Pillai
 1987 – Kana Kannan Nair
 1988 – Kannan Pattali
 1989 – Mankompu Sivasankara Pillai
 1991 – Guru Krishnankutty
 1991 – Kalamandalam Padmanabhan Nair
 1992 – Guru Kelu Nair
 1993 – Cherthala Thankappa Panicker
 1994 – Chandramana Govindan Namboothiri
 1995 – Kalamandalam Gopi
 1996 – Kottakkal Sivaraman
 1997 – Kalamandalam Kesavan (Melam)
 1998 – Kalamandalam Gangadharan (Music)
 1999 – Nelliyode Vasudevan Namboodiri (Vesham)
 2000 – Kottakkal Krishnankutty Nair (Vesham)
 2001 – Pandalam Kerala Varma
 2001 – Sadanam Sreedharan (Madhalam)
 2001 – Varanasi Madhavan Namboothiri (Chenda)
 2002 – Sadanam Krishnankutty (Vesham)
 2003 – Kalamandalam Vasu Pisharody
 2003 – Thonnakkal Peethambaran
 2005 – Mudakkal Gopinathan Nair (Music)
 2006 – Kalamandalam K. G. Vasudevan (Vesham)
 2009 – Kottakal Nandakumaran Nair (Vesham)
 2009 – Kalanilayam Unnikrishnan (Music)
 2010 – FACT Padmanabhan (Vesham)
 2010 – Madambi Subramanian Namboodiri (Music)
 2010 – Kalamandalam Narayanan Nair (Madhalam)
 2010 – Mathoor Govindan Kutty (Vesham)
 2011 – Inchakkad Ramachandran Pillai
 2011 – Sreenarayanapuram Appu Marar (Chenda)
 2012 – Kalamandalam V. Subramanian
 2014 – Sadanam K. Harikumaran
 2015 – Kuroor Vasudevan Namboodiri (Chenda)
 2016 – Kottakkal Chandrasekhara Warrier (Vesham)
 2016 – Kottakkal Madhu (Music)
 2017 – Kalamandalam Oyur Ramachandran
 2018 – Kalamandalam C. M. Balasubramanian
 2018 – Kalamandalam Unnikrishnan (Chenda)
 2018 – Pathiyoor Sankarankutti (Music)
 2019 – Kalamandalam Rajasekharan
 2019 – Kalamandalam C. V. Sukumaran

Mohiniyattam

 1972 – Chinnammu Amma
 1974 – Kalamandalam Kalyanikutty Amma
 1976 – Kalamandalam Satyabhama
 1983 – Kalamandalam Ambika
 1985 – Kalamandalam Sugandhi
 1988 – Kalamandalam Sumathi
 1990 – Kalamandalam Leelamma
 1991 – Kalamandalam Vimala Menon
 1993 – Kalamandalam Lakshmi
 1997 – Kalamandalam Chandrika
 1998 – Kala Vijayan
 2003 – Nirmala Panicker
 2004 – Kalamandalam Radhika
 2005 – Shyamala Surendran
 2006 – Deepti Omchery Bhalla
 2007 – Neena Prasad
 2008 – Gopika Varma
 2008 – Pallavi Krishnan
 2009 – Vinitha Nedungadi
 2010 – Methil Devika
 2011 – Sunanda Nair
 2012 – Sreedevi Rajan
 2013 – Vijayalakshmi
 2014 – Smitha Rajan
 2015 – Jayaprabha Menon
 2016 – Kalamandalam Hymavathy
 2017 – Kalamandalam Husnabhanu
 2019 – Kalamandalam Rajalakshmi
 2020 – Kavitha Krishnakumar
 2021 – R. L. V. Ramakrishnan

Bharatanatyam

 1975 – Kalamandalam Kshemavathy
 1983 – Kalamandalam Saraswathy
 1995 – Kalakshetra Vilasini
 1996 – Kalamandalam Chandrika
 2011 – Girija Chandran
 2012 – Rajashree Warrier
 2013 – Rama Vaidyanathan
 2018 – Aswathy V. Nair
 2019 – Uma Sathyanarayanan

Dance

 1966 – Guru Gopinath
 1973 – P. K.Poduval (Ottan Thullal)
 1977 – Guru Chandrasekharan
 1978 – Kottayam Chellappan
 1979 – Chemancheri Kunhiraman Nair
 1980 – Vechoor Thankamani Pillai (Ottamthullal)
 1981 – Shadow Gopinath
 1982 – Tripunithura Madhava Menon
 1986 – Dancer Sankarankutty
 1987 – P. K. Vijayabhanu
 1987 – K. T. Kumaran Asan (Ottan Thullal)
 1988 – A. K. Sivaram
 1989 – Kalamandalam Gangadharan
 1989 – Thiruvalla Ponnamma (Ottan Thullal)
 1990 – Tripunithura Aravindaksha Menon
 1991 – K. S. Divakaran Nair (Ottan Thullal)
 1992 – Nattuvar Parameswara Menon
 1993 – Saraswathy Malhotra
 1994 – Bhavani Chellappan
 1996 – Kalamandalam Prabhakaran (Ottan Thullal)
 1997 – Kalamandalam Devaki (Ottan Thullal)
 1998 – N. V. Krishnan
 1998 – Evoor Damodaran Nair (Ottan Thullal)
 1999 – Guru Gopalakrishnan
 1999 – Kusumam Gopalakrishnan
 1999 – Oachira P. R. Sankarankutty
 2000 – Ennakkad Narayanankutty
 2000 – Manorama Balakrishnan
 2000 – Kalamandalam Geethanandan (Ottan Thullal)
 2001 – V. Mydhili
 2002 – Kalamandalam Vanaja
 2005 – Kalanilayam Govindankutty
 2008 – S. Lekha Thankachi (Kerala Natanam)
 2013 – Kalamandalam Vasudevan (Ottan Thullal)
 2014 – Manju Warrier (Kuchipudi)
 2015 – Sreelakshmy Govardhanan (Kuchipudi)
 2017 – Kalamandalam Mohanakrishnan (Ottan Thullal)
 2018 – Gayathri Subramanian (Kerala Natanam)
 2020 – Manalur Gopinath (Ottan Thullal)
 2020 – Vinayachandran (Kerala Natanam)
 2021 – Kalamandalam Sathyavrathan (Kerala Natanam)
 2021 – Geetha Padmakumar (Kuchipudi)

Koothu–Koodiyattam

 1964 – Ammannur Chachu Chakyar
 1971 – Painkulam Narayana Chakyar
 1972 – Painkulam Rama Chakyar
 1979 – Subhadra Nangiyaramma
 1981 – Irinjalakuda Narayanan Nambiar (Padakam)
 1982 – Haripad Achuthadas (Padakam)
 1983 – Ammannur Parameswara Chakyar
 1985 – C. K. Krishnan Nambiar (Mizhavu)
 1986 – Puthiyedath Mani Neelakanda Chakyar
 1992 – K. K. Rajendran
 1993 – P. K. Narayanan Nambiar (Mizhavu)
 1998 – Kalamandalam Sivan Namboodiri (Koodiyattam)
 2001 – Mani Damodara Chakyar (Chakyarkoothu)
 2001 – P. K. G.Nambiar (Koodiyattam)
 2001 – Kalamandalam Girija (Koodiyattam)
 2002 – Margi Sathi (Koodiyattam)
 2003 – Ammannur Parameswaran (Kuttan Chakyar) (Koodiyattam)
 2005 – Venu G.
 2006 – Painkulam Damodara Chakyar
 2008 – Kalamandalam Rama Chakyar (Koodiyattam)
 2009 – Painkulam Narayana Chakyar (Koodiyattam)
 2011 – Margi Madhu
 2013 – Mani Vasudeva Chakyar
 2014 – Usha Nangiar
 2014 – V. K. K. Hariharan (Koodiyattam)
 2017 – Kalamandalam Kanakakumar (Koodiyattam)
 2018 – Kalamandalam Shylaja (Koodiyattam, Nangiar koothu)
 2019 – Kalamandalam Sindhu (Nangiar koothu)
 2020 – Kalamandalam Jishnu Prathap (Koodiyattam)

Krishnanattam
 1975 – A. Gopalan Nair
 1977 – V. P. Narayana Pisharody 
 1983 – K. Velayudhan Nair
 2012 – T. P. Aravinda Pisharody
 2015 – K. Sukumaran

Keraleeya Vadyangal

 1969 – Annamanada Achutha Marar (Panchavadyam)
 1972 – Thiruvegappura Rama Marar
 1974 – T. S. Ramaswamy Iyer (Chenda)
 1979 – Chithali Rama Marar (Chenda)
 1981 – Neetiyath Govindan Nair (Panchavadyam)
 1983 – Annamanada Parameswara Marar (Timila)
 1983 – Kadavallur Aravindakshan (Madhalam)
 1983 – Pallavur Appu Marar (Idakka)
 1986 – Kombath Kuttan Panicker (Kurumkuzhal)
 1986 – Nireechan Kanjan Poojari (Thudi)
 1987 – Chottanikkara Narayana Marar (Timila)
 1988 – Kuzhur Kuttappa Marar (Panchavadyam)
 1989 – Aliparambu Sivarama Poduval (Chenda)
 1990 – Othikunnath Kuttykrishnan Nair (Kurumkuzhal)
 1991 – Kuzhur Narayana Marar (Panchavadyam)
 1995 – Pallavur Maniyan Marar (Timila)
 1996 – Mattannoor Sankarankutty (Chenda - Thayambaka)
 1997 – Thrippekulam Achutha Marar (Melam)
 1999 – Thrithala Kunjikrishna Poduval (Thayambaka)
 1999 – Edappal Appunni (Madhalam)
 2000 – Chakkumkulam Appu Marar (Melam)
 2001 – Cherpulassery Sivan (Madhalam)
 2002 – M. Sankaranarayanan 
 2001 – Peruvanam Kuttan Marar (Chenda)
 2003 – Kadanad V. K. Gopi (Mridangam)
 2003 – Cherthala A. K. Ramachandran (Mridangam)
 2004 – Chengamanad Appu Nair (Kombu)
 2005 – Aliparambu Sivarama Poduval (Chenda, Idakka)
 2006 – Margi Somadas (Chenda)
 2007 – Kalamandalam Narayanan Nambisan (Madhalam)
 2008 – Thrikkur Rajan (Panchavadyam - Madhalam)
 2009 – Kalpathy Balakrishnan (Thayambaka)
 2010 – Machad Ramakrishnan Nair (Kombu)
 2010 – Cheruthazham Chandran (Thayambaka)
 2011 – Kelath Aravindaksha Marar (Chenda)
 2012 – Kalanilayam Babu (Madhalam)
 2012 – Elanjimel P. Susheel Kumar (Mridangam)
 2012 – Kelath Kuttappan Marar (Timila)
 2013 – Kallekulangara Achuthankutty Marar (Thayambaka)
 2014 – E. P. Vijayan Marar (Vadya Kala)
 2015 – Malamary Sasi (Drums)
 2016 – Kottakkal Ravi (Madhalam)
 2016 – Kalamandalam Krishnadas (Chenda)
 2017 – Peruvanam Satheesan Marar (Chenda)
 2017 – Kunissery Chandran (Madhalam)
 2017 – Kongad Madhu (Timila)
 2018 – Machad Manikandan (Kombu)
 2018 – Porur Unnikrishnan (Thayambaka)
 2018 – Kariyannur Narayanan Namboodiri (Timila)
 2019 – Velappaya Nandanan (Kurumkuzhal)
 2019 – Thichur Mohanan (Idakka)
 2020 – Peringode Chandran (Timila)
 2021 – P. C. Chandra Bose (Instrumental Music)
 2021 – Peringode Subramanyan (Idakka)
 2021 – Pazhuvil Reghu Marar (Melam)
 2021 – Thamarakudi R. Rajasekharan (Mukharsangh)

Sopana Sangeetham
 1981 – Njeralattu Rama Poduval (Sopana Sangeetham)
 1985 – Mankombu Viswanatha Kurup (Ashtapathi)
 1993 – Janardhanan Nedungadi (Sopana Sangeetham)
 2016 – Njeralathu Harigovindan (Sopana Sangeetham)

Light Music

 1982 – Thoppil Anto
 1983 – M. S. Baburaj (Posthumous)
 1983 – Kamukara Purushothaman
 1985 – Thrissur P. Radhakrishnan
 1986 – K. P. Udhayabhanu
 1987 – Santha P. Nair
 1990 – P. Gokulapalan
 1992 – M. K. Arjunan
 1993 – A. P. Gopalan
 1994 – Perumbavoor G. Raveendranath
 1995 – M. G. Radhakrishnan
 1996 – Kanhangad Ramachandran
 1997 – M. S. Naseem
 1997 – Sara Gul Mohammed (Special Award)
 1998 – C. O. Anto (Overall contribution)
 1998 – Amachal Ravi
 1998 – Kalavoor Balan (Music Direction)
 1999 – A. K. Sukumaran
 1999 – P. K. Medini (Janakeeya Sangeetham)
 2000 – Kumarakom Rajappan
 2000 – Dharman Ezhome
 2000 – Kallara Gopan
 2001 – Jerry Amaldev
 2002 – K. P. Brahmanandan
 2003 – Vadakara Krishnadas
 2003 – Darsan Raman
 2004 – Vidyadharan
 2004 – Ayiroor Sadasivan
 2005 – Zero Babu
 2005 – Sibella Sadanandan
 2006 – K. P. A. C. Chandrasekharan
 2006 – Poovachal Khader (Lyrics)
 2007 – V. T. Murali
 2007 – Haripad K. P. N. Pillai (Direction)
 2008 – Latha Raju
 2008 – Cheravally Sasi (Lyrics)
 2009 – Murali Sithara
 2009 – B. Arundhathi
 2010 – Tripunithura Girija Varma
 2011 – Selma George
 2011 – Poochakkal Shahul Hameed (Lyrics)
 2012 – Alleppey Vivekanandan (Direction)
 2012 – Rajeev Alunkal
 2013 – R. K. Damodaran
 2013 – Vaikom Vijayalakshmi
 2014 – Kottayam K. Veeramani
 2014 – M. D. Rajendran
 2015 – S. Ramesan Nair
 2016 – Chengannur Sreekumar
 2017 – Vijayan Poonjar
 2019 – R. K. Ramadas
 2020 – Raana Murali
 2020 – Natesh Shankar
 2021 – Manju Menon

Keraleeya Kalakal

 1969 – Chandu Peruvannan (Theyyam)
 1974 – Chirukanda Panicker (Poorakkali)
 1975 – Kannan Peruvannan (Theyyam)
 1976 – Pazhoor Kunjan Marar (Mudiyett)
 1977 – Kadammanitta Raman Nair (Padayani)
 1978 – Ahmed Musaliar (Duffmuttu)
 1979 – Palanthoni Velayudhan Asan (Porattu Natakam)
 1980 – Madathil Sivasankan Nair (Kanyarkali)
 1981 – Kunjambu Panicker Karivellur (Poorakkali)
 1981 – Athiyadam P. P. Kanna Peruvannan (Theyyam)
 1982 – P. K. Madhavan Pillai (Padayani)
 1982 – P. P. Koru (Thirra)
 1983 – A. V. Kunhirama Panicker (Theyyam)
 1983 – Marangattil Thomman Lookka (Margamkali)
 1985 – Guru Kalliassery Gopal Pillai (Padayani)
 1986 – Kannan Perumalayan (Theyyam)
 1987 – M. Krishna Panicker (Poorakkali)
 1988 – P. P. Madhava Panicker (Poorakkali) 
 1988 – C. A. Aboobakkar (Mappilakalakal)
 1989 – Kurichi P. S. Kumaran (Arjuna Nritham)
 1990 – Nalakath Khasim (Mappilappattu)
 1990 – Pallikulathil Chindan Peruvannan (Theyyam)
 1991 – Rayarath Ummer (Oppana)
 1992 – Valiyakath Kuttyali (Cheenimuttu)
 1992 – Chummar Choondal (Natankala)
 1992 – V. P. Damodara Panicker (Poorakkali)
 1992 – V. P. Kannan Muthoodan (Theyyam)
 1993 – Sheni Gopalakrishna Bhat (Yakshaganam)
 1993 – C. K. Panicker (Theyyam)
 1993 – T. V. Sankara Panicker (Poorakkali)
 1993 – N. P. Abdul Gurukkal (Kolkali)
 1994 – G. Bharghavan Pillai (Natankala)
 1994 – Pazhoor Damodara Marar (Mudiyett)
 1994 – Chandpasha (Mappilappattu)
 1994 – Eshi Joseph (Chavittu Natakam)
 1995 – Chandragiri Ambu (Yakshaganam)
 1995 – K. P. Dharman Panicker (Theyyam)
 1995 – Kadammanitta Vasudevan Pillai (Padayani)
 1996 – Vengara Krishnan Panicker (Poorakkali)
 1996 – Kizhara Othena Peruvannan (Theyyam)
 1997 – Edakkottil Appukutty Asan (Thirra)
 1997 – P. Raghavan Panicker (Poorakkali)
 1997 – V. M. Kutty (Mappilappattu)
 1998 – Kannan Karnamoorthy (Theyyam)
 1998 – Savithri Brahmaniyamma (Brahmanippattu)
 1999 – Edavalath Kannapoduval (Kolkali)
 1999 – Pappinissery Kunhiraman Panicker (Poorakkali)
 1999 – Joseph Moly (Chavittu Natakam)
 2000 – Andol Balakrishna Panicker (Poorakkali)
 2001 – P. M. Charles (Chavittu Natakam)
 2001 – P. T. Kesavan Embranthiri (Thidambu Nritham)
 2002 – Chippar Krishnayya Balla (Yakshaganam)
 2002 – S. A. Jameel (Mappilappattu)
 2002 – Maneek Manakil (Chavittu Natakam)
 2002 – V. Balan (Poothamkali)
 2003 – K. Dwaraka Krishnan (Kanyarkali)
 2003 – Bakker Edakkazhiyoor (Arabanamuttu)
 2004 – A. G. Nair (Yakshaganam)
 2004 – K. G. Sathar (Mappilappattu)
 2004 – Mathukutti Asan (Parichamuttukali)
 2005 – Kurian Chacko (Margamkali)
 2006 – P. V. Krishnan Anjoottan Nileshwaram (Theyyam)
 2006 – Jhansi Sebastian Tripunithura (Margamkali)
 2007 – Kurichi Natesan (Arjuna Nritham)
 2009 – Eranjoli Moosa (Mappilappattu)
 2011 – Thampi Payyappilly (Chavittu Natakam)
 2011 – Sreedharan Asan (Kakkarissi Natakam)
 2013 – Britto Vincent (Chavittu Natakam)
 2013 – Vakkom Sajeev (Samudra Natanam)
 2013 – Madhu Gopinath (Samudra Natanam)
 2014 – Puthumana Govindan Namboothiri (Thidambu Nritham)
 2014 – Kunjiraman Vaidar (Theyyam)
 2015 – Janardhanan Puthusseri (Natanpattu)
 2016 – Kuttur Prasannakumar (Padayani)
 2016 – Mannur Chandran (Porattu Natakam)
 2016 – Keezhillam Unnikrishnan (Mudiyett)
 2017 – Roy Georgekutty (Chavittu Natakam)
 2018 – Palamthoni Narayanan (Porattu Natakam)
 2019 – Madikai Unnikrishnan (Thidambu Nritham, Melam)

Kathaprasangam

 1966 – Sathyadevan
 1978 – Joseph Kaimaparamban
 1979 – Kollam Babu
 1986 – Kadaikodu Viswambharan
 1987 – V. Harshakumar
 1989 – Vadakara V. Ashokan
 1990 – Ochira Ramachandran
 1991 – H. Ramlabeegam
 1992 – Harippad Saraswathi Ammal
 1994 – Thevarthottam Sukumaran
 1995 – Kadavoor Balan
 1996 – Cherthala Balachandran
 1998 – K. P. Chandrahasan
 1999 – Edakkochi Prabhakaran
 2001 – Gopinath
 2002 – Thodiyoor Vasanthakumari
 2003 – Niranam Rajan
 2004 – Vayalar Baburaj
 2005 – Seena Pallikkara
 2006 – Manamboor D. Radhakrishnan
 2007 – Ayilam Unnikrishnan
 2008 – Pala Nandakumar
 2009 – Chirakkara Salimkumar
 2010 – Marayamuttom Johny
 2012 – Edakochi Salimkumar
 2013 – Vinod Champakara
 2015 – Kannur Ratnakumar
 2016 – Sooraj Sathyan K.
 2017 – Pulimath Sreekumar
 2018 – M. R. Payyattam
 2019 – Vasanthakumar Sambasivan
 2020 – Trikkulam Krishnan Kutty
 2021 – Vanchiyoor Praveen Kumar

Prakshepana Kala

 1975 – T. P. Radhamani
 1981 – K. Padmanabhan Nair
 1983 – C. S. Radhadevi
 1987 – Rajam K. Nair
 1990 – R. Rajakumari
 1991 – K. V. Manikandan Nair
 1991 – C. P. Rajasekharan
 1992 – A. Prabhakaran
 1993 – Nagavally R. S. Kurup
 1994 – N. K. Sebastian
 1999 – K. S. Ranaprathapan
 2004 – M. Thankamani
 2005 – K. A. Muralidharan
 2006 – Beban Kaimaparamban
 2007 – S. Radhakrishnan
 2008 – Satheesh Chandran
 2010 – T. T. Prabhakaran
 2012 – Ravi Vallathol
 2013 – Leelamma Mathew

Magic
 1995 – Gopinath Muthukad
 1997 – Padmaraj
 2000 – Samraj
 2001 – Pradeep Hudino
 2002 – P. M. Mithra
 2003 – Nilambur Pradeep Kumar
 2011 – R. K. Malayath
 2014 – Shamsudheen Cherpulassery (Street Magic)

Mimicry
 2010 – Kottayam Nazeer

See also
 Kerala Sangeetha Nataka Akademi Fellowship
 Sangeet Natak Akademi Award
 Sangeet Natak Akademi Fellowship

References
 General

 
 
 
 
 
 
 
 
 
 
 
 
 
 

 Footnotes

External links

Awards established in 1962
Civil awards and decorations of India
Indian art awards
Indian music awards
Dance awards
Kerala Sangeetha Nataka Akademi
1962 establishments in Kerala